Protein THEMIS is a protein encoded by the eponymous THEMIS gene.

Function 

This protein plays a regulatory role in both positive and negative T cell selection during late thymocyte development. The protein functions through T-cell antigen receptor signaling, and is necessary for proper lineage commitment and maturation of T-cells. Changes in THEMIS gene expression due to the rs138300818 variant promote the development of early-onset type 1 diabetes.

The name 

THEMIS is an acronym for thymocyte-expressed-molecule. Themis is also the name of a Titan in Greek mythology who weighed the fates of humans, an apt choice since the protein is important in deciding the fate of the T cell during development.

References

Further reading